David Weitzman, QC (18 June 1898 – 6 May 1987) was a British Labour Party politician.

Weitzman was born in Blackburn and educated at Hutchesons' Grammar School, Glasgow, Manchester Central School and Manchester University. He served in the Manchester Regiment in the First World War. After graduating he was called to the Bar (Gray's Inn) and became a member of the Northern Circuit. He contested Stoke Newington unsuccessfully at the 1935 general election but it was a Labour gain at the 1945 general election.

In October 1947, he was convicted of conspiracy related to unlawful supply of toilet preparations (lipstick) by his brothers' Newington Supply Co. contrary to wartime regulations, and was sentenced to 12 months imprisonment and fined £500.  This was quashed in March 1948.

For the 1950 election his seat was reconstituted as Hackney North and Stoke Newington and he went on to represent the constituency for a further 29 years.

For the five years leading up to his retirement in 1979, he was the last sitting British MP born in the 19th century, the last born during the Victorian era, the oldest member of the House of Commons, and the last Member of Parliament to have served in the First World War. After his retirement, Bob Edwards became the oldest sitting British MP.

He was married three times and had a son and a daughter from the first marriage. He died on 6 May 1987 aged 88.

References
 "Times Guide to the House of Commons", Times Newspapers Limited, October 1974 and 1979 editions.

External links 
 

1898 births
Weitszman, David
Labour Party (UK) MPs for English constituencies
English King's Counsel
British Army personnel of World War I
Hackney Members of Parliament
UK MPs 1945–1950
UK MPs 1950–1951
UK MPs 1951–1955
UK MPs 1955–1959
UK MPs 1959–1964
UK MPs 1964–1966
UK MPs 1966–1970
UK MPs 1970–1974
UK MPs 1974
UK MPs 1974–1979
English Jews
People educated at Hutchesons' Grammar School
Jewish British politicians
Manchester Regiment soldiers
20th-century English lawyers